Redemption is the debut solo album by Chris Volz (Flaw, Five.Bolt.Main), released on September 11, 2007. The album's first single is the title track "Redemption". The album sold approximately 700 copies in its first week of release.

Track listing
 "Redemption" – 3:39
 "Altercation" – 2:46
 "All My Life" – 3:20
 "Wrong" – 2:37
 "Your Own Medicine" – 3:40
 "Once Again" – 4:47
 "Sometimes" – 4:11
 "Secure" – 3:16
 "Dear Life" – 4:31
 "Stories of Old" – 3:33
 "Don't Save Me" – 3:16

References

2007 debut albums
Rock Ridge Music albums